Higher End or Billinge Higher End is an area of the Metropolitan Borough of Wigan, Greater Manchester,  England.

Governance
Billinge was a civil parish lying within the historic county boundaries of Lancashire on 2 February 1837 it was divided into two townships, Billinge Chapel End and Billinge Higher End when the Wigan poor law union was formed merging the workhouse provision of 20 parishes in the Wigan area. The poor law union built the Wigan Poor Law Infirmary in 1906 which became Billinge Hospital. In 1872 Billinge Local Board of Health was established for the area of these two townships and two detached parts of Winstanley township (one known as Blackley Hurst and the other situated in the Carr Mill area, both lying within the area of Billinge Chapel End township).

In 1894 the area of the Local Board (together with the remaining area of Winstanley township) became Billinge Urban District and in 1927 the urban district was renamed Billinge and Winstanley Urban District.

In 1974 most of Billinge Higher End (excepting Billinge Hill)) and most of Winstanley became part of the Metropolitan Borough of Wigan in Greater Manchester, with Billinge Chapel End (including the remainder of Winstanley) becoming part of St Helens Metropolitan Borough in Merseyside.

Geography
Adjacent places include:
Billinge, Merseyside
Crank
Orrell
Winstanley

Billinge Higher End encompasses Longshaw.

Communal facilities
 Winstanley College

Transport
Higher End sits on the B5206.  Train services to Wigan town centre, Manchester and Kirkby are available from the nearby Orrell railway station.

See also

 Listed buildings in Billinge and Winstanley

References

Geography of the Metropolitan Borough of Wigan
Areas of Greater Manchester